The 2018–19 Towson Tigers men's basketball team represented Towson University during the 2018–19 NCAA Division I men's basketball season. The Tigers, led by eighth-year head coach Pat Skerry, played their home games at the SECU Arena in Towson, Maryland as members of the Colonial Athletic Association. They finished the season 10–22 overall, 6–12 during CAA play to finish in a tie for eighth place. Awarded the No. 9 seed in the CAA tournament, they lost to No. 8 seed James Madison 73–74 in the first round.

Previous season
The Tigers finished the 2017–18 season 18–14, 8–10 in CAA play to finish in fifth place. They lost in the quarterfinals of the CAA tournament to William & Mary.

Offseason

Departures

Incoming transfers

Under NCAA transfer rules, Gray will have to sit out from the 2018–19 season. Will have two years of remaining eligibility.

2018 recruiting class

2019 recruiting class

Roster

Honors and awards

Street & Smith's Preseason Top Newcomer  
Solomon Uyaelunmo

Lindy's Preseason Newcomer of the Year 
Solomon Uyaelunmo

Schedule and results

|-
!colspan=12 style=| Non-conference regular season
|-

|-
!colspan=12 style=| CAA regular season

|-
!colspan=9 style=| CAA tournament

Source

References

Towson Tigers men's basketball seasons
Towson
Towson
Towson